The Austin Crows is a United States Australian Football League team, based in Austin, Texas, United States. It was founded in 2002. They play in the Mid American Australian Football League.  The Crows are a mix of Australians, Americans and many other nationalities as well as a wide range of ages and backgrounds.

Club Achievements

Texas Cup 
The Texas Cup is a three way series between the Texas-based USAFL Clubs, the Houston Lonestars, Dallas Dingoes and Austin Crows.
 Champions (Men's): 2013, 2014, 2015, 2016, 2018, 2019, 2021

USAFL National Championships 
The USAFL National Championships is the premier club competition of North America held annually over a weekend in October.
 Division 1 Premiers (Men's): 2013, 2015, 2016, 2018, 2019, 2021
Reserves Premiers (Men's): 2017, 2018

International Cup representatives

2014 
 Christian Merritt
 Jeffrey Talmadge
 Ben Carpenter-Nwanyanwu

Zilker Park

The Crows practice at iconic Zilker Park in downtown Austin with the city skyline in the background.

References

External links
 

Australian rules football clubs in the United States
Sports in Austin, Texas
Australian rules football clubs established in 2002
2002 establishments in Texas